Bonnie Brooks  (born 1953) is a Canadian department store executive who is former vice-chairman of Hudson's Bay Company, having formerly served as president and CEO of its department store arm Hudson's Bay.

On July 6, 2016 Hudson's Bay announced via press release that Bonnie Brooks would retire in December 2016.

Brooks was born in 1953 to Gordon and Rose Brooks and was raised in London, Ontario. After university she worked at Dylex's owned Fairweather, then with upscale retailer Holt Renfrew before moving to Hong Kong to work for Lane Crawford as president from 1997 to 2008.

In December 2016, Brooks was named a Member of the Order of Canada.

References

External links
Marketing Hall of Legends: "Bonnie Brooks - MHOL 2013 Builder"

Living people
Canadian women in business
Hudson's Bay Company people
Canadian chief executives
Businesspeople from London, Ontario
1953 births
Members of the Order of Canada